Columnaria is an extinct genus of rugose coral that lived from the Late Ordovician to the Late Devonian.  Its remains have been found in Australia, Europe, and North America.

Sources 
Columnaria at the Field Museum's Evolving Planet

External links
Columnaria in the Paleobiology Database

Rugosa
Prehistoric Hexacorallia genera
Ordovician cnidarians
Silurian cnidarians
Devonian cnidarians
Paleozoic invertebrates of Oceania
Paleozoic animals of Europe
Paleozoic animals of North America
Late Ordovician first appearances
Late Devonian animals
Late Devonian genus extinctions
Fossils of Georgia (U.S. state)
Paleozoic life of Ontario
Paleozoic life of Nunavut
Paleozoic life of Quebec